Black Boots on Latin Feet is the second studio album by Ezio, released in 1995. The album, which takes its name from the lyrics of its opening song, Saxon Street, was released on the Arista Records label. Much is made of the fact that Tony Blair picked track 4, Cancel Today, as one of his Desert Island Discs when he appeared on that show in 1996, as at the time few people had heard of the band.

Track listing

All songs written by Ezio Lunedei

"Saxon Street" – 4:48
"30 and confused" – 4:31
"Just to talk to you again" – 4:24
"Cancel today" – 4:51
"Go"  - 4:53
"Steal away" – 3:53
"The further we stretch" – 3:39
"Tuesday night" – 6:07
"Thousand years" – 4:20
"Agony" – 3:04
"Wild side" – 3:49
"Brave man" – 3:48
"Angel song" – 5:20

Credits 
Ezio – guitar, vocals
Booga – guitar
Jean-Michel Biger – drums
Sydney Thiam – percussion
Rupert Hine – keyboards, bass and backing vocals

See also
1995 in music

Ezio (band) albums
1995 albums
Arista Records albums